Quequeisque was a professional football club in Nueva San Salvador, (Santa Tecla) which have played the Primera División de Fútbol Profesional.

They are the only team in El Salvador besides Hércules in soccer history to win 5 or more straight championships (Salvadoran football champions). Although the tournaments won were only in the Central Zone Region of El Salvador, they are often considered as national titles.

History
Quequeisque were founded in 1896, being one of the first football clubs founded in El Salvador. They got their name from the Quequeisque farm from Santa Tecla. Walter Soundy a notable person in Santa Tecla was the founder of the team, he was the owner of the Quequeisque farm. The team won five straight titles albeit only from the central district of El Salvador. These titles are still recognized as national titles.

They participated in the very first truly national tournament in 1947 and continued until the 1963–64 season when they were relegated. The club became defunct in 1968.

However, in 2015, Jorge Rosa purchased the license of former team Real Destroyer, and the club was brought back from almost fifty years hiatus and competed in the 2015–2016 Segunda division.

The venture lasted one year before they changed name and moved operations to Izalco and became Brujos de Izalco.

Records

Club Records
 First Match (prior to creation of a league): vs. TBD (a club from TBD), Year
 First Match (official): vs. TBD, year
 Most points in La Primera: 00 points (00 win, 00 draws, 0 losses) Year/Year
 Least points in La Primera: 00 points (0 win, 0 draws, 00 losses) Year/year

Individual records
 Most capped player for El Salvador: 50 (0 whilst at Quequeisque), TBD
 Most international caps for El Salvador while a Quequeisque player: 1, TBD
 Most goals in a season, all competitions: unknown player, O (Year/year) (00 in League, 00 in Cup competitions)
 Most goals in a season, La Primera: TBD, 7

Honours
First Division League Championship(s): 5
1941, 1942, 1943, 1944, 1945, 1946

Second Division League Championship(s): 1
1961-62

Colours and Past kits

Originally the club colours were black and white with stripes and black shorts. They used a red uniform and this was used until 1968 when they dissolved. However, when the club were resurrected in 2015 they chose to play in a white shirt with blue strips. In 2016 they returned to their original colours black and white.

Current squad
As of Apertura 2015:

List of Coaches
  Jorge Calles (July 2015 – Nov 2015)
  Mauricio Alfaro (Nov 2015 – Feb 2016)
  Luis Guevara Mora (Feb 2016– Sep 2016)
  Jorge Calles (Sep 2016–)

Notable Coaches
 Marcelo Estrada 
 Jorge Cabrera Rajo

References

External links
 Primera División de Fútbol Profesional Official Website (Spanish)
 Con el espíritu de la hoja brava – La Prensa Gráfica  (although the information is about Santa Tecla F.C. has some info on Quequeisque)

Defunct football clubs in El Salvador
1896 establishments in El Salvador
1968 disestablishments in El Salvador